Snapshot Games is a Bulgarian video game developer headquartered in Sofia. Snapshot Games was founded in 2013 by Julian Gollop and David Kaye. Gollop is recognized for creating the X-COM video game franchise in the 1990s with X-COM: UFO Defense and X-COM: Apocalypse. Gollop also is the CEO of Snapshot Games. In addition to Gollop, the company includes about eight developers who are industry veterans with years of previous experience working for Ubisoft Sofia, Crytek Black Sea, and other Bulgaria studios.

History

On November 12, 2013, Snapshot Games was founded as a privately held corporation in the state of California of the United States. However, it is based in Bulgaria where its CEO, Julian Gollop, lives and where video game development costs are about one-third of what they would be for a similar studio in the United States.

In April 2014, Snapshot Games launched a Kickstarter to crowdfund the development of its first video game, Chaos Reborn. The effort was successful, generating over $210,000. The game was made available through the Early Access program of Steam on December 9, 2014 before it was released officially on October 26, 2015. The game received a score of 86/100 on review aggregation website Metacritic. PC Gamer awarded it a score of 87%, saying "A true wizard’s wheeze, and a fine return for one of gaming’s oldest tactical classics." The game also was nominated for a Golden Joystick Award in the 2015 Best Indie Game category but lost to Kerbal Space Program.

Julian Gollop teased the development of a new video game, Phoenix Point, on Twitter on March 18, 2016. For the next year, Snapshot Games worked on designing and producing the game. After investing $450,000 into this first year of development, the company launched a Fig crowdfunding campaign in April 2017 to obtain the $500,000 they budgeted to complete the game. The future of Snapshot relied on the success of the campaign. "There is no Plan B," Gollop said to the press at the time. The campaign was successful, raising more than $765,000 from over 10,300 different contributors. Snapshot Games has committed to release Phoenix Point in 2019.

In November 2020, Embracer Group announced that they acquired the company through Saber Interactive, which will be the parent company.

Video games

References

External links
 

2013 establishments in California
2020 mergers and acquisitions
Companies based in Sofia
Indie video game developers
Saber Interactive
Video game companies established in 2013
Video game companies of Bulgaria
Video game development companies